North was an Australian boy band established in 2004. Popular primarily in Asia, the group had top ten singles in Thailand, Indonesia, Malaysia, the Philippines, and India. Their debut single was a cover of Peter Cetera's "Glory of Love" which reached No. 1 in both Indonesia and Thailand. North disbanded in 2006.

Members 

The band's initial line-up consisted of Alfred Touhey, Beau McCleish, Scott Folley and Thanh Bùi.

Scott Folley chose to leave the band after the release of their first album and promotional tour, and was replaced by Joel Velasco, who first appeared on North's single "Cos I Love You".

The group disbanded in 2006.

After break-up 
Thanh Bùi became a contestant on the 6th season of Australian Idol and was eliminated during the Top 8 Results Night. He was one of four judges on The Voice of Vietnam Kids.

Alfred Tuohey became a producer and artist manager for Mozart & Friends Studio.

Discography

Albums
2004: North (on Universal)
2006: Straight Up (on EMI)

Singles

(Selective)
2004: "Glory of Love"
2004: "I Won't Hold Back"
2006: " 'Cos I Love You"
2006: "I Am Strong"

References

Victoria (Australia) musical groups
Australian boy bands